Kelly Maree Applebee (born 28 January 1982) is a former Australian cricketer. A right-handed middle-order batter, she was capped at under-23 level for Australia. She played 131 List A matches for Victoria between the 2001–02 and 2015–16 seasons of the Women's National Cricket League (WNCL). She captained Victoria and made 2,492 runs in the WNCL. Applebee also played for the Melbourne Stars in the Women's Big Bash League (WBBL) during the 2015–16 season.

Applebee was born in Bairnsdale, Victoria. She has a child with her partner Emma. She has worked for the AFL Players Association and the Australian Cricketers' Association.

References

External links
 
 

1982 births
Living people
Australian cricketers
Australian women cricketers
Victoria women cricketers
Melbourne Stars (WBBL) cricketers
Cricketers from Victoria (Australia)
Sportswomen from Victoria (Australia)
People from Bairnsdale
LGBT cricketers
Australian LGBT sportspeople